The Arizona League Cardinals were the rookie level farm club of the St. Louis Cardinals in the Arizona League from 1989 to 1994. They were based in Peoria, Arizona from 1990 to 1992 and in Chandler, Arizona from 1993 to 1994.

References
 Baseball Reference

Baseball teams established in 1989
Baseball teams disestablished in 1994
Defunct Arizona Complex League teams
Professional baseball teams in Arizona
St. Louis Cardinals minor league affiliates
1989 establishments in Arizona
1994 disestablishments in Arizona
Defunct baseball teams in Arizona